Broadway-Fillmore (formerly known as Polonia) is a neighborhood in Buffalo, New York.

Geography 

Broadway-Fillmore is in the lower East Side of Buffalo. The neighborhood is centered along Broadway running west–east and Fillmore Avenue running north–south.

History/Culture 
Broadway-Fillmore was once home to a large Polish/Eastern European population in Buffalo. The neighborhood has long since fallen into poverty and disrepair in the mid-late 20th century.

Today a large African American population along with new immigrants are trying to breathe new life into the neighborhood.

Goo Goo Dolls lead singer John Rzeznik grew up here. The neighborhood later became inspiration for the song "Broadway".

Notable sites
Broadway Market
Buffalo Central Terminal
Corpus Christi Church
Saint Stanislaus Church
Saint John Kanty Church

See also
Neighborhoods of Buffalo, New York

References

External links 
Broadway Fillmore Alive
Polonia

Neighborhoods in Buffalo, New York